This is the alphabetical list of the highest points of the Indian states and union territories.

States

Union territories

Gallery

See also 

 List of hill stations in India
 List of mountains in India
 List of the tallest statues in India
 List of tallest buildings in India
 List of tallest structures in India
 Rameswaram TV Tower, tallest Towers in India
 Tourism in India

References

States and territories by highest point
 
States and territories by highest point
Lists of highest points in Asia
Tourism
Tourism in India